Officer Downe is a 2016 American action thriller film directed by Shawn Crahan and produced by  Mark Neveldine.

Plot
A deceased police officer is resurrected from the dead to continue his war on crime.

Cast

 Kim Coates as Officer Downe
 Tyler Ross as Officer Gable
 Lauren Vélez as Chief Berringer
 Glenn Howerton as Dominic
 Sam Witwer as Burnham
 Lindsay Pulsipher as Tiger
 Reno Wilson as Carter
 Mark Neveldine as Hazmat #1
 Adi Shankar as Crook #2
 Tracy Vilar as Hanso
 Shad Gaspard as Brick
 Corey Taylor as Headcase Harry
 Bruno Gunn as Fritch
 Meadow Williams as Mother Supreme
 Alison Lohman as Sister Blister

Production
The film was first announced on July 15, 2013. Kim Coates was confirmed to play the lead role on February 20, 2015. The rest of the cast was confirmed on April 1, 2015.

Filming began in March 2015. Joe Casey, who created the comic series on which the film is based, wrote the film's screenplay. The first images from the film were revealed on May 15, 2015. More images from the film were released on May 13, 2016. Producer Mark Neveldine confirmed that the film would be rated R by the MPAA.

It had its world premiere at the LA Film Festival in June 2016.

Reception

Officer Downe received generally negative reviews. Review aggregator Rotten Tomatoes gives the film a 33% “fresh” rating with an average score of 4.9 out of 10. Scott Tobias, writing for Variety, called it a “thoroughly repugnant piece of comic-book juvenalia.” Mike D’Angelo, critic for The A.V. Club wrote, “Officer Downe has no real story and no point of view-just endless, assaultive testosterone.”

IGN awarded it a score of 6.8 out of 10, saying "While it has some enjoyable moments, there are too many missed opportunities when the film could have taken it to the next level."

References

External links
 
 
 

2016 action thriller films
Films based on American comics
Films based on Image Comics
2010s supernatural thriller films
American supernatural thriller films
2016 films
American action thriller films
2010s English-language films
2010s American films